Never on Sunday is a 1960 Greek romantic comedy film starring, written by and directed by Jules Dassin.

The film tells the story of Ilya, a Greek prostitute (Melina Mercouri), and Homer (Dassin), an American classicist. Homer attempts to steer her toward morality while Ilya attempts to make Homer more relaxed. It constitutes a variation of the Pygmalion plus "hooker with a heart of gold" story.

The film's bouzouki theme became a hit and the film won the Academy Award for Best Original Song (Manos Hadjidakis for "Never on Sunday"). It was nominated for Academy Awards for Best Actress in a Leading Role (Mercouri), Best Costume Design, Black-and-White, Best Director and Best Writing, Story and Screenplay as Written Directly for the Screen (both Dassin). Mercouri won the award for Best Actress at the 1960 Cannes Film Festival.

Plot
Ilya, a self-employed, free-spirited prostitute who lives in the port of Piraeus in Greece, meets Homer Thrace, an American tourist and classical scholar and passionate Philhellene. Homer feels that Ilya's promiscuity typifies the degradation of Greek classical culture and attempts to steer her onto the path of morality while Ilya attempts to relax him.

Cast 
 Melina Mercouri as Ilya
 Jules Dassin as Homer Thrace
 Giorgos Fountas as Tonio
 Titos Vandis as Jorgo
 Mitsos Ligizos as The Captain (as Mitsos Lygizos)
 Despo Diamantidou as Despo
 Dimos Starenios as Poubelle
 Dimitris Papamichael as Sailor (as Dimitri Papamichael)
 Alexis Solomos as Noface
 Thanassis Veggos
 Phaedon Georgitsis as Sailor
 Nikos Fermas as Waiter

Reception 
When the film was first released in Italy in 1960, the Committee for the Theatrical Review of the Italian Ministry of Cultural Heritage and Activities rated it as VM16, not suitable for children under 16. The committee also demanded dialogue modifications and the excision of explicit scenes.

Home media
MGM released Never on Sunday on VHS in 2000 as part of its Vintage Classics lineup.

References

External links 
 
 

1960 films
1960 romantic comedy films
1960s sex comedy films
1960s English-language films
English-language Greek films
1960s Greek-language films
Greek black-and-white films
Films about prostitution in Greece
Films set in Greece
Films shot in Greece
Films that won the Best Original Song Academy Award
Films directed by Jules Dassin
Greek multilingual films
Piraeus
American multilingual films
Films scored by Manos Hatzidakis
Greek romantic comedy films
1960s multilingual films
Censored films